Jennifer Piepszak is an American financial executive and has been the Chief Financial Officer (CFO) of JPMorgan Chase since May 1, 2019. Her appointment was announced on April 17, 2019. She succeeded Marianne Lake, who was the CFO since 2012. Barron's named Piepszak one of the 100 Most Influential Women in U.S. Finance. Crain's New York named Piepszak the No. 2 Most Powerful Women in New York in 2019. American Banker named Piepszak the No. 4 Woman to Watch in 2018.

Early life
Piepszak graduated with a Bachelor of Science degree from Fairfield University.

Career
Piepszak joined JPMorgan Chase in 1994 and has held various roles in the firm's investment banking and consumer banking divisions, including CFO of mortgage banking, CFO of investment bank credit portfolio, controller of retail financial services, and controller of global equities and prime services.

From 2017 to 2019, Piepszak was the Chief Executive Officer (CEO) of JPMorgan's Chase Bank Card Services division, covering small business, consumer and commercial card businesses. Prior to that, she was the CEO of Business Banking from 2014 to 2017.

Piepszak succeeded Marianne Lake as the CFO of JPMorgan Chase & Co. in 2019.

The Wall Street Journal speculated that Piepszak may be in line to succeed Jamie Dimon as CEO of JPMorgan Chase.

Personal life
Jennifer is married to Richard C. Piepszak, and they have three children.

References

Fairfield University alumni
Living people
American bankers
JPMorgan Chase employees
American women business executives
American women bankers
American business executives
Year of birth missing (living people)
21st-century American women